Levitate is the seventh studio album by English musician Lone, released on 27 May 2016 by R&S Records; it departs from the calm hip house style of his prior album Reality Testing for quicker, psychedelic tracks that are a hybrid of breakbeat, hardcore, and jungle. It was ranked the 16th best album of 2016 by Dummy and the 44th best by Mixmag.

Track listing

Charts

References 

2016 albums
Lone (musician) albums
R&S Records albums